Sommarlovsmorgon (Summer vacation Morning) is a TV-series for children, broadcast by Sveriges Television every morning during the Swedish summer holidays, before 2011 only Monday–Friday. Since 2007 it has been possible to watch the program in the evening when it is repeated. During the Swedish Christmas holidays a TV series called Jullovsmorgon was broadcast, from the Christmas of 1970/71 to 2008/09. Every year's "Sommarlovsmorgon" broadcasts TV series/films.

Series
According to Swedish Media Database.

1978–1987 – Sommarmorgon
1988–1989 – Sommarlov
1990 – Sommarlov with Gila Bergqvist, Ellinor Persson and Jan Trolin
1991 – Sommarlov with Gila Bergqvist, Peter Settman and Fredrik Granberg
1992 – Volrammos
1993–1994 – Tippen with Lasse Beischer and Morgan Alling
1995 – Sommarlov with Sara and Erik Haag
1996 – Kloak
1997 – Salve
1998 – Alarm
1999 – Mormors magiska vind
2000–2001 – Vintergatan
2002 – Högaffla Hage
2003–2004 – Badeboda Bo/Sommarkåken
2005 – Sommarlov 05
2006–2008 – Hej hej sommar
2009 – Sommarlov 09
2010–present (2020) – Sommarlov

See also
Sveriges Radio's Christmas Calendar
Sveriges Television's Christmas calendar

References

Sveriges Television original programming
Swedish children's television series
1970s Swedish television series
1980s Swedish television series
1990s Swedish television series
2000s Swedish television series
2010s Swedish television series
1978 Swedish television series debuts